Mohamed Zouaki (born 12 September 1941) is a Moroccan hurdler. He competed in the men's 400 metres hurdles at the 1960 Summer Olympics.

References

1941 births
Living people
Athletes (track and field) at the 1960 Summer Olympics
Moroccan male hurdlers
Olympic athletes of Morocco
Place of birth missing (living people)